Clavicoccus is a genus of insect in family Pseudococcidae. It contains the following species:
Clavicoccus erinaceus Ferris, 1948
Clavicoccus tribulus Ferris, 1948

References

Taxonomy articles created by Polbot
Sternorrhyncha genera
Pseudococcidae